This is a comprehensive list of Wolf Prize winners affiliated with the Institute for Advanced Study in Princeton, New Jersey as current and former faculty members, visiting scholars, and other affiliates.  These winners are all in mathematics and physics.  No Institute scholar has as of 2015 ever won a Wolf Prize in Chemistry, Medicine, Arts, or Agriculture.

References

Institute for Advanced Study
Wolf Prize laureates